Princess Marina Petrovna of Russia (11 March 1892 – 15 May 1981) was a daughter of Grand Duke Peter Nikolaevich of Russia and his wife, Grand Duchess Militza Nicholaevna, born Princess of Montenegro.

Biography
A great-granddaughter of Tsar Nicholas I of Russia, she was born in Nice and grew up in the last period of Imperial Russia, mostly in Znamenka, her father's summer palace near Peterhof.

Princess Marina was a gifted artist, showing talent for drawing and painting. She studied painting first with a teacher from the senior school in Yalta and then in Saint Petersburg under professor Kordovsky.  

Grand Duchess Maria Pavlovna suggested Princess Marina as a likely bride to the Duke of Montpensier, son of the Count of Paris.  

During World War I, Marina served as a nurse with Caucasian troops near Trabzon.  

She escaped the Russian Revolution with the rest of her family aboard the British ship  in 1919. She married Prince Alexander Nikolayevich Golitsyn in 1927. She died on 15 May 1981 in Six-Fours-les-Plages, France, at aged 89.

Notes

References
 Zeepvat, Charlotte, The Camera and the Tsars, Sutton Publishing, 2004, .
 Zeepvat, Charlotte, Romanov Autumn, Sutton Publishing, 2000, 

1892 births
1981 deaths
Female nurses in World War I
Nurses from the Russian Empire
Russian people of World War I
People from Nice
Marina Petrovna
Emigrants from the Russian Empire to France
Princesses of royal blood (Russia)
Russian princesses by marriage